Jack Nethercutt may refer to:

People 

 J.B. Nethercutt (1913-2004) - Founder of the Nethercutt Collection
 Jack Nethercutt II (Born 1936) - Former professional racer
Disambiguation pages
Nethercutt-Richards family